The Terror Factor is a 2007 American independent comedy horror film written and directed by Garry Medeiros and starring Matthew G. Hill, Nina Rusin, and John Sylvia. It premiered on October 30, 2007, and was completed on a US$2,000 budget. The film was voted "Best of New England" at the 2007 Rhode Island International Horror Film Festival and was later screened at the 2008 Fright Night and Rock & Shock Film Festivals. In 2010, it was released on DVD by Maxim Media International.

The story follows Warren Wilcox (Matthew G. Hill), an escaped mental patient, who terrorizes a group of local teenagers he finds partying in his childhood home. Wilcox's killing spree is interrupted by an aspiring serial killer (Antonio Dias), who takes advantage of the panic created by the escapee, and leads to an eventual showdown between the two.

Plot summary 

A young boy named Warren Wilcox stands over the body of his father, moments after stabbing him to death, and then pursues his mother with an axe. She locks herself in a room but Wilcox soon breaks through the door and kills her. He is subsequently institutionalized at a local mental hospital. Thirty years later, on the anniversary of his parents murder, Wilcox escapes from the facility and heads for his childhood home in Dartmouth, Massachusetts. A local reporter, Fred Gordon, describes the escape from outside the Wilcox home and interviews Sheriff Bob Grady who imposes an 8 o'clock curfew on the town. As the interview ends, a man is seen turning off his television and pulling out a video cassette after taping the news segment. His room is adorned with swastikas and satanic imagery. The man walks across the room to a bedroom window and uses a camera to watch the girl across the street kissing her boyfriend.

Later that day, Chez is lying in bed thinking about the recent breakup with his girlfriend Cathy. Chez's friend Ringo attempts to console him and invites Chez to go along on a double date. Ringo explains that his new girlfriend Jodi wants to defy curfew by spending the night at "the old Wilcox house". Chez declines the offer but is unwilling to be "cooped up inside all night" and decides to ignore the curfew as well. He has a brief conversation with his younger sister Lauren who is waiting for her boyfriend Mike to return from work. Neither appear to take the threat of Wilcox's escape seriously and they sarcastically say their "goodbyes" to each other. As he prepares to leave the house Chez is approached by his neighbor Matt, the man who had earlier been spying on Lauren and Mike, and a brief argument ensues with Chez warning Matt to leave his sister alone before driving away. Meanwhile Ringo and Jodi, along with Reanna and Dave, arrive at the abandoned Wilcox residence. It is here that their night of terror begins.

Cast 

Matthew G. Hill as Warren Wilcox, a monstrous thug with a childlike mind and a disturbing secret.
Antonio Dias as Matt, a deviant "homegrown" serial killer who lives across the street from Chez and Lauren.
Garry Medeiros as Chez
Nina Rusin as Lauren
Christopher Reed as Mike
John Sylvia as Ringo
Ligia Lopez as Jodi
Maria Joanna Lopez as Reanna
John Procaccini as Dave
Marc Manzone as Sheriff Bob Grady
Dave Lepine as Mr. Wilcox
Jennifer Cardoza as Mrs. Wilcox

Production 

The Terror Factor was the feature film debut of writer-director Garry Medeiros. A 1994 graduate of Dartmouth High School, he was a largely self-taught filmmaker. Medeiros had made a number of amateur shorts before starting his first major film project. The film's production started in August 2000 and took seven years to complete. Filming was delayed several times due to actors dropping out of the project requiring key scenes to be reshot or cut from the film altogether, and numerous script rewrites. The abrupt departure of John Procaccini, the film's original star, ultimately led to Medeiros's minor character becoming the main protagonist. The director was also forced to take a two-year hiatus from filming for family reasons. Medeiros described his experience on Sai-Con Productions official Facebook page:

The film was shot on a $2,000 budget with an all volunteer crew numbering around 12 people. Medeiros handled many roles including cinematography, lighting, musical score, set design, and other duties. He also worked on editing with cast members Matthew Hill and John Sylvia, and special effects with Sylvia and his brother Richie Medeiros. Another brother, musician David Medeiros, served as assistant cameraman and had a cameo role along with his Reflections of Mortality bandmates. The band provided some of the original soundtrack. The Terror Factor was shot at various locations in Dartmouth, New Bedford, and Wareham, Massachusetts. The final scene was shot at Cape Cod Express, a Wareham trucking company, where Garry Medeiros was then employed.

Prior to the film's release, Medeiros co-hosted a Sunday night public access television series, The Father Galen Indie Horror Mass, with Terror Factor star Matthew Hill. The show featured a tongue-in-cheek parody of religious figures on public access in the form of Catholic priest Father Galen, played by Hill, paired with a puppet who served as comic relief for the duo. The Father Galen Indie Horror Mass showcased independent horror films typically unavailable in mainstream U.S. rental outlets.

Reception 

The Terror Factor premiered at the 2007 Rhode Island International Horror Film Festival on October 30, 2007 and beat out 40 other local films to win the "Best of New England" award. The film made its theatrical debut at the Holy Ghost Grounds in South Dartmouth on November 2, 2007, and was screened at the Fright Night and Rock & Shock Film Festivals the following year. The Terror Factor was eventually picked up by Maxim Media International and released on DVD in 2010.

Alex DiVincenzo of Horror 101.com gave the film a favorable review, noting the homage to Halloween and Friday the 13th, and complimenting Medeiros' skillful imitation of John Carpenter's directing style, earning a score of 61 out of 101. Film critic Hayes Hudson called the film "a lot of fun", with a unique twist on a familiar horror film storyline, and wrote that Medeiros' cinematography was "very well done and the overall look to the picture is perfect". He did, however, criticize the overuse of profanity, feeling that it took away from the cast's performance, and claimed that "[he'd never] heard the F-bomb dropped so much in a single movie ... not even Casino".

Awards and nominations

References

External links 
 
 
 
 

2007 films
2007 horror films
2000s comedy horror films
American independent films
American comedy horror films
Films set in Massachusetts
American slasher films
2007 directorial debut films
2007 comedy films
Films shot in Massachusetts
2000s English-language films
2000s American films